Rashid Riaz (born 27 February 1976) is a Pakistani cricket umpire and former first-class cricketer. He is now an umpire and has stood in matches in the 2015–16 Quaid-e-Azam Trophy. He stood in his first Twenty20 International (T20I) match between Pakistan and Australia on 28 October 2018. He stood in his first One Day International (ODI) match, also between Pakistan and Australia, on 29 March 2019.

In October 2019, he was appointed as one of the twelve umpires to officiate matches in the 2019 ICC T20 World Cup Qualifier tournament in the United Arab Emirates. In January 2020, he was named as one of the sixteen umpires for the 2020 Under-19 Cricket World Cup tournament in South Africa. In January 2022, he was named as one of the on-field umpires for the 2022 ICC Under-19 Cricket World Cup in the West Indies.

See also
 List of Twenty20 International cricket umpires
 List of One Day International cricket umpires

References

External links
 

1976 births
Living people
Pakistani cricketers
Pakistani cricket umpires
Pakistani One Day International cricket umpires
Pakistani Twenty20 International cricket umpires
Lahore cricketers
People from Chiniot District